This list of fashion awards is an index to articles on notable awards given for fashion. It is organized by the country of the sponsoring organization, but entries are not always limited to that country.

List

See also

Lists of awards
List of design awards

References

 
Awards